Mary Whiteford (born November 10, 1964) is an American politician from Michigan. Whiteford is a Republican member of Michigan House of Representatives from District 80.

Education 
In 1986, Whiteford earned a BS degree in Registered Nursing from Northern Illinois University.

Career 
In 1986, Whiteford started her career as a staff nurse at Children's Memorial Medical Center. Whiteford left the medical center in 1999.

In 1997, Whiteford became a co-owner of Whiteford Wealth Management.

After the removal of Cindy Gamrat, the seat for District 80 was vacated. On November 3, 2015, Whiteford won the special primary election. On March 8, 2016, Whiteford won the special general election and became a Republican member of Michigan House of Representatives for District 80. Whiteford defeated David Gernant and Arnie Davidsons with 64.0% of the votes. On November 6, 2018, Whiteford won the election and continued serving District 80. Whiteford defeated Mark Ludwig with 63.65% of the votes.

Personal life 
Whiteford's husband is Kevin. They have 3 children. Whiteford and her family live in Casco Township, Michigan.

See also 
 2014 Michigan House of Representatives election
 2016 Michigan House of Representatives election
 2018 Michigan House of Representatives election

References

External links 
 Mary Whiteford at ballotpedia.org
 Lt. Gov Brian Calley announces election dates to fill seats..

1964 births
Living people
Republican Party members of the Michigan House of Representatives
Women state legislators in Michigan
21st-century American politicians
21st-century American women politicians
Northern Illinois University alumni